The 2005 Women's Pan-American Volleyball Cup was held from 8 to 19 June 2005 in Santo Domingo, Dominican Republic. It was the fourth edition of the annual women's volleyball tournament and was attended by twelve countries. The intercontinental event served as a qualifier for the 2006 FIVB World Grand Prix.

Competing nations

Squads

Preliminary round

Group A
Friday 10 June

Saturday 11 June

Sunday 12 June

Monday 13 June

Tuesday 14 June

Group B
Friday 10 June

Saturday 11 June

Sunday 12 June

Monday 13 June

Tuesday 14 June

Final round

Quarterfinals
Thursday 16 June

Semifinals
Friday 17 June

Finals
Thursday 16 June — Eleventh place match

Thursday 16 June — Ninth place match

Friday 17 June — Seventh place match

Friday 17 June — Fifth place match

Saturday 18 June — Bronze medal match

Saturday 18 June — Gold medal match

Final ranking

Cuba, the Dominican Republic, Brazil and the United States qualified for the 2006 FIVB World Grand Prix.

Individual awards

Most Valuable Player

Best Spiker

Best Scorer

Best Blocker

Best Setter

Best Digger

Best Server

Best Libero

Best Receiver

Best Coach

References

External links
 NORCECA Results

Women's Pan-American Volleyball Cup
Pan-American Volleyball Cup
Volleyball
2005 in Dominican Republic sport